Daharki is a city in Ghotki District in the Sindh province of Pakistan. It is the capital of Daharki Taluka, an administrative subdivision of the district. It is situated about 100 km northeast of Sukkur, between Mirpur Mathelo and Ubauro on Pakistan's N-5 National Highway. According to the 2017 Census of Pakistan it is the 93rd largest city of Pakistan, having population of 103,557.

Economy
Daharki is home to several cotton factories, fertilizer plants, and oil and gas exploratory facilities, among other industries. Notable companies with facilities at Daharki include Engro Fertilizers, Mari Petroleum, and Tullow Oil. Nearby power stations include Star Power Plant, Fauji Power Plant and Liberty Power Plant. Engro Fertilizer's recently built fertilizer plant is the largest ammonia and urea plant in the world, covering 1.24 square miles. The facility's prilling tower, built in 2009, is the tallest prilling tower in the world, at a height of about 125.

Arab conquest 

In 711, Umayyad General Muhammad Bin Qasim conquered the Daharki area, after defeating Raja Dahir, a member of the Brahmin dynasty and the last Hindu ruler of Sindh at Aror, 60 miles south of Daharki. Many of the Arab soldiers of Bin Qasim's army, mostly originating from Palestine, settled in Multan, Punjab, and Sindh, including in the Daharki area.

Religion
Daharki is predominantly Muslim and Hindu, with small Christian and Sikh minorities. Important Muslim religious sites in and around the city include Bharchundi Shareef Dargah, Chalan Faqeer, Pir Aziz Karmani, Pir Pakhroi Laal, Soi Sharif, Pir Gulab, and Shah Bukhari. The Bharchundi Sharif dargah and its custodian is Mian Abdul Khaliq. Hindu sites include the spiritual darbar and the Sant Satram Das Temple at Raharki, 5 km away from Daharki. 
 Christian sites include St.Francis Xavier Church, which was rebuilt in 2011.

The Baba Nanik Shah gurdwara is a place of worship for Daharki's Sikh and Sindhi population.

Education 

There are several schools in Daharki, those being:
 Daharki School System
Al Karim Public Secondary School Keenjhar
 Twinkle Little Star Public School, Gulab Shah Colony Daharki
 Safa Grammar School Daharki
 Oxford English Grammar High School Daharki
 Shah Abdul Latif Model High School Daharki
 The Educator Campus Daharki
 Cambridge Public School Daharki
 Kids Garden Public School
 Engro Model School
 Pakistan Foundation Public High School Daharki
 Madina Public Model High School Daharki
 Sindh Public School Daharki
 Laat Human Development Daharki School
 The Smart School Campus Daharki
 New Kids Garden Public High School Daharki
 The Scholar Grammar School Daharki
 New Roshan Tara Model High School Daharki 
 Fatima Public School Daharki
 British Grammar School Daharki
 Government P High School Daharki
 Government Single Section High School Daharki
 Government Main Primary school Daharki
 Engro Grammar School
 Engro Daharki College
 The Muslim Generation School (Chachar Muhallah Daharki)
 WK Degree College Daharki
 DUA PUBLIC School Jung Colony UBAID-Zubair Pitafi School Jung Colony
 Happy Public School Jung Colony Daharki
 New Galaxy Grammar School Jung Colony Daharki
 The Leaders School Daharki
 Pakistan Foundation Public High School Daharki
 Allied School Daharki
 Hira Public School Daharki
 Ghazali Public School Daharki
 The Savvy School Daharki Campus
 Sahara High School Daharki
 The SMILE School Daharki
 The Citizen Foundation (TCF) Engro Daharki
 Al Hamd Public School Daharki
 Shining Model School Daharki
 Jinnah Model School Daharki
 Gohar Public School Jung Colony Daharki
 Sir Syed Public School Daharki
 The Kids University School Daharki
 Modern Public School Daharki
 The Excellence Grammar School Daharki
 Little Angels Grammar High School Daharki
 Montessori Public School Daharki
 Evershine Public School Daharki
 Sahkar Public School Daharki
 Beacon Hall High School Daharki
 Mari Petroleum Higher Secondary School, Daharki.
 Noor-e-Sahar Special Education School; Mari Petroleum, Daharki.
 The Citizen Foundation (TCF), Mari Petroleum, Daharki
Bright Beginning Higher Secondary School, Daharki

References

Cities and towns in Ghotki District